Alois Lipburger (27 August 1956 – 4 February 2001) was an Austrian ski jumper.

Career
He won a silver medal in the individual large hill competition at the 1978 FIS Nordic World Ski Championships in Lahti. Lipburger's only two individual world cup wins came in a ski flying competition in the United States in 1981. After his career, he worked as a ski jumping coach. However, he died in an automobile accident while returning from a World Cup event in Willingen in 2001.

World Cup

Standings

Wins

External links

1956 births
2001 deaths
Austrian male ski jumpers
Austrian ski jumping coaches
FIS Nordic World Ski Championships medalists in ski jumping
People from Bregenz District
Road incident deaths in Germany
Sportspeople from Vorarlberg
20th-century Austrian people